Port Watch is a Canadian television documentary miniseries concerning the marine industry which aired on CBC Television in 1955.

Premise
This series was produced in Vancouver with host Thomas Gilchrist, a sea captain who wrote for various CBC productions including Tidewater Tramp.

Scheduling

 18 July 1955 - This episode featured George Unwin who supervised salvage activities on the MV Gulf Stream, a passenger vessel which capsized in British Columbia waters.
 25 July 1955 - Marine firefighting procedures were described, including scenes of a fireboat in Vancouver.
 1 August 1955 - This episode explored the challenges of loading and unloading freighters and highlighted how longshoremen were hired.

References

CBC Television original programming
1955 Canadian television series debuts
1955 Canadian television series endings
1950s Canadian documentary television series
1950s Canadian television miniseries
Black-and-white Canadian television shows